= Nikolay Boshnakov =

Bulgarian officer and fighter pilot

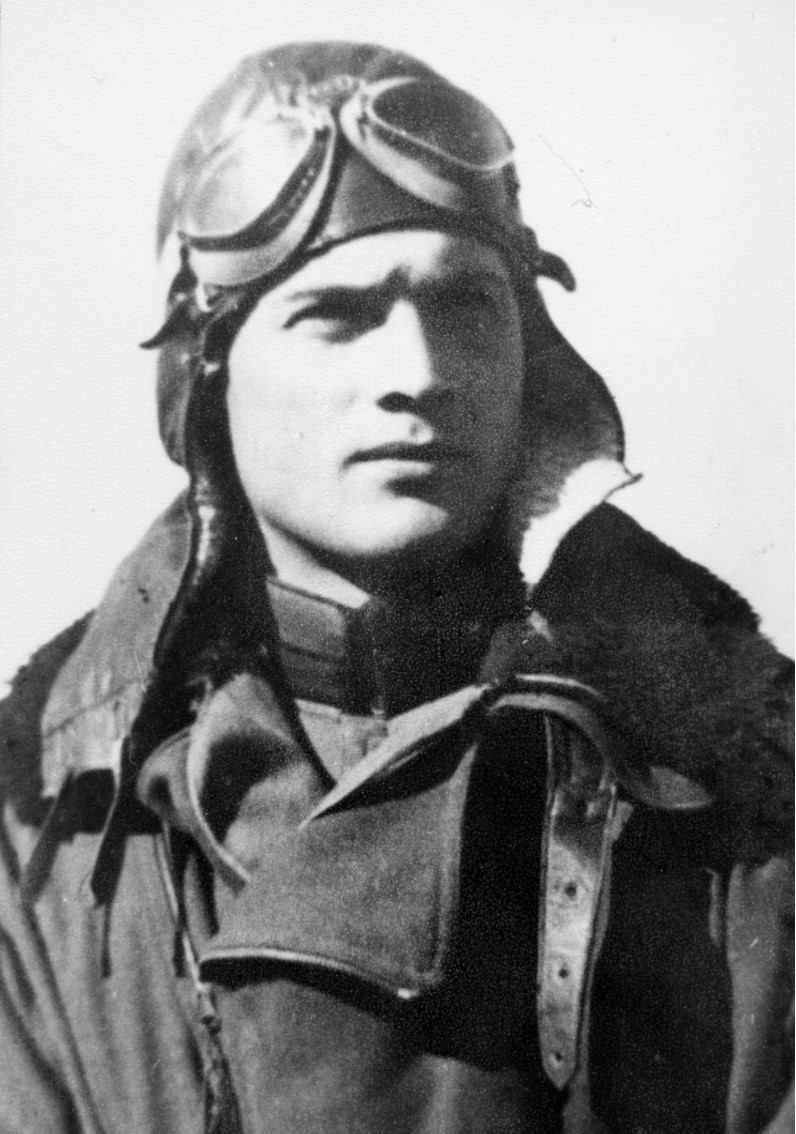
Bosh02 copy

Nikolay Stoyanov Boshnakov (Bulgarian: Николай Стоянов Бошнаков) (3 April 1911 – 16 August 1948) was a Bulgarian officer and fighter pilot who fought in World War II.

== Biography ==
Boshnakov was born on April 3, 1911, in Pleven. In 1933, he graduated from Military School and on September 6 he was promoted to the rank of second lieutenant and appointed to military service at Fourth Pleven Regiment. Later he graduated from the Kazanlak school for the training of pilots. In 1937, he joined the Bulgarian Air Force.

Boshnakov was appointed as commander of Wing 2/6. He relocated to Vrazhdebna airport, where he was in charge of directly defending Bulgaria's capital Sofia. As a commander and fighter pilot, he took part in seven air battles, with four victories. After being wounded in battle he saved his life by catapulting.
